Alexis Lesieur Desaulniers (August 31, 1837 – July 9, 1918) was a Quebec lawyer and political figure. He represented Maskinongé in the House of Commons of Canada.

Early background

He studied at the Séminaire de Nicolet, Université Laval and McGill University.  He was called to the bar in 1861.  He was the father of Arthur Lesieur Desaulniers, who was a Member of the House of Commons from 1917 to 1930 for the district of Champlain.

City Politics

Desaulniers served as a Councilmember in Louiseville in 1891.

Provincial Legislature

Desaulniers was elected as a member of the Conservative Party to the Legislative Assembly of Quebec in 1867 for the district of Maskinongé. He lost re-election in 1871, against Liberal Moïse Houde. He tried to make a comeback in 1875, but was defeated again.

House of Commons

Desaulniers also tried to be elected to the House of Commons in 1878, 1884, 1887, 1900.  He was successful on his third attempt only, winning a by-election. He represented the district of Maskinongé from 1884 to 1887 and sat with members of the Conservative Party.

Footnotes

1837 births
1918 deaths
Conservative Party of Quebec MNAs
Conservative Party of Canada (1867–1942) MPs
Members of the House of Commons of Canada from Quebec